Kinlen is an Irish surname, a variant of Ó Caoindealbháin, Ó Caoinleáin, Ó Conalláin, Conlon, Connellan, Quinlan and Quinlivan.

Notable people with this name include
  Dermot Kinlen, Irish Inspector of Prisons 
  Leo Kinlen, British cancer researcher
 John Kinlen murdered in 1816 in Firhouse, Ireland

References

Surnames of Irish origin